Buigues is a surname. Notable people with the surname include:

Bernard Buigues (born 1954), French explorer
Iván Buigues (born 1996), Spanish footballer
Robert Buigues (born 1950), French footballer and manager